Peter VI (also referred to as  the Cossack) was Prince of Moldavia between August 1592 and 25 October 1592.

His nickname comes from his good relation with the Zaporozhian Cossacks.

The data about his origin are uncertain. It is believed that he was the son of Alexandru Lăpuşneanu.

Peter Cossack was killed on 25 October 1592 by strangulation.

References 

Rulers of Moldavia
House of Bogdan-Mușat
16th-century Romanian people
1592 deaths
16th-century murdered monarchs
Year of birth unknown
Murder in 1592
Deaths by strangulation